Center Court refers to:

 Centre Court, the main court at a tennis complex, specifically at Wimbledon.
 CenterCourt, a development in Kentucky.
 A series on Tennis Channel